The National Assembly of Republika Srpska (abbr. НСРС/NSRS) is the legislative body of Republika Srpska, one of two entities of Bosnia and Herzegovina. The current assembly is the ninth since the founding of the entity.

History
The National Assembly of Republika Srpska was founded on 24 October 1991 as the Assembly of the Serb People of Bosnia and Herzegovina, with its administrative seat in Sarajevo. Due to the Bosnian War, the seat was moved to Pale, where it remained until 1998, when it was moved to Banja Luka, its current location.

First Assembly (24 October 1991 to 14 September 1996)
Second Assembly (19 October 1996 to 27 December 1997) (election of 4 September 1996)
Third Assembly (27 December 1997 to 19 October 1998) (election of 14 September 1997)
Fourth Assembly (19 October 1998 to 16 December 2000) (election of 13 September 1998)
Fifth Assembly (16 December 2000 to 28 November 2002) (election of 11 September 2000)
Sixth Assembly (28 November 2002 to 9 November 2006) (election of 5 October 2002)
Seventh Assembly (9 November 2006 to 15 November 2010) (election of 1 October 2006)
Eighth Assembly (15 November 2010 to 24 November 2014) (election of 3 October 2010)
Ninth Assembly (24 November 2014 to 19 November 2018) (election of 12 October 2014)
Tenth Assembly (19 November 2018 to 15 November 2022) (election of 7 October 2018)
Eleventh Assembly (15 November 2022 to present) (election of 2 October 2022)

Current composition

See also
List of speakers of the National Assembly of Republika Srpska

References

External links

Politics of Republika Srpska
Bosnia and Herzogovina parliaments